Abraham Israel Ze'evi (c. 1650 – 1731) was an 18th-century Israeli rabbi at Hebron.

Life
Ze'evi was a great-grandson of Jerusalem rabbi Israel ben Azariah Ze'evi, and grandson of the Moroccan kabbalist Abraham Azulai. He was a pupil of his uncle, Isaac Azulai and was married to the daughter of Abraham ben Levi Conque.  His cousin, Abraham ben David Yitzhaki, the Chief Rabbi of Palestine, married his daughter.

From 1701 to 1731, Ze'evi was chief rabbi of Hebron where he headed the "Emeth le-Ya'akov" yeshivah which had been founded by Abraham Pereira of Amsterdam. It was the oldest such college still functioning in Hebron at the turn of the 20th century. He also acted as an emissary of Hebron, visiting Constantinople in 1685 where he met Tzvi Ashkenazi.

Works
He authored a number of works including:
Orim Gedolim (The Great Lights) — a treatise on rabbinical law which included talmudic novellae, sermons and responsa; (Smyrna, 1758).

References

Rabbis in Hebron
17th-century rabbis from the Ottoman Empire
18th-century rabbis from the Ottoman Empire
Sephardi rabbis in Ottoman Palestine
Rosh yeshivas
1650s births
1731 deaths
Year of birth uncertain